Lauren Isenberg (born May 7, 2002), known professionally as Renforshort (stylized as renforshort) is a Canadian singer and songwriter from Toronto. Debuting independently in 2019 with the singles "Waves" and "Mind Games", Isenberg released her debut extended play, the Teenage Angst EP, in March 2020.

Life and career

Early life 

Lauren Isenberg was born in Toronto. Her parents' taste of music influenced her at an early age, and she was exposed to musicians such as Billy Joel, The Velvet Underground and Nirvana. As a child, she won a Chinese language competition for performing the folk song "Mo Li Hua". Isenberg wrote her first song at 13 years old called "Hopeless Town", which was produced by Nathan Ferraro of the Canadian band The Midway State, and worked on several songs in Los Angeles with producer Justin Gray, however decided that none of these songs showed off her full personality. She began posting covers of songs to YouTube and Soundcloud in 2015, starting with a cover of Labrinth's "Jealous". At 14, Isenberg decided that singing was her passion after performing at an open mic night.

Isenberg met Canadian producer Jeff Hazin in 2016, who became her long-time collaborator (Isenberg has continued to work with the same co-writers since 2016). In the same year, she collaborated with German drummer and YouTuber Sina Doering on her album Chi Might.

Debut 

Under the moniker Ren, Isenberg released her debut single "Waves" in February 2019. Music executives from Geffen Records took notice of her due to the song's popularity, and organized a meeting with her only a month after its release. Isenberg's second single "Mind Games" became a viral hit, and by November the two tracks had amassed five million streams across platforms. "Mind Games" was later nominated for the 2019 SOCAN Songwriting Prize.

Isenberg's first single with Geffen Records was released in November, entitled "IDC". On March 13, 2020, Isenberg released her debut extended play, the Teenage Angst EP, and changed her stage name to Renforshort. The leading single from the release, "I Drive Me Mad", was inspired by Isenberg's experiences with anxiety and panic attacks. Promotion for the EP was difficult, as scheduled showcases in Toronto, New York and Los Angeles were delayed in an effort to flatten the curve against the COVID-19 pandemic. She is a support act on YUNGBLUD’s Life on Mars tour.

Later Works 
In 2021 Ren released another EP titled off saint dominique EP which was released through Interscope Records on June 4. It was met with positive reviews from critics with NME describing it as " A celebration of ever changing emotion" and publication Dork called the EP as having a "striking take on lyricism that continues to impress with a refreshing level of self-reflection" As of January 2022 the EP has surpassed 15 million streams on Spotify.

Artistry 

Renforshort's music is inspired by acts such as Bob Dylan and Amy Winehouse, and from films such as Coraline and Call Me by Your Name.

Personal life

Isenberg's mother is a real-estate agent. She has three brothers.

Discography

Studio albums 

 Dear Amelia (2022)

Extended plays

Singles

Guest appearances

References

Living people
2002 births
21st-century Canadian women singers
Geffen Records artists
Musicians from Toronto